Rampura may refer to the following places:

 Rampura, Jalaun, a town in Uttar Pradesh, India
 Rampura, Nagaur, a village in Nawa in Nagaur district, Rajasthan, India
 Rampura, Neemuch, a town in Madhya Pradesh, India
 Rampura State, a former princely state in Mahi Kantha, Gujarat, India
 Rampura Phul, a town in Bathinda district of Indian Punjab
 Rampura Thana, an administrative division of Dhaka, Bangladesh

See also
 Rampur (disambiguation)